The Great Synagogue of Tel Aviv is located on 110 Allenby Street, Tel Aviv, just east of the Shalom Tower. The building was designed by Yehuda Magidovitch in 1922 and completed in 1926. It was renovated in 1970 with a new external facade of arches.

In the past, the synagogue was at the center of Little Tel Aviv, but today the building lies at the heart of the business and financial center. The emigration of the local residents during the 1960s brought about a recognizable reduction in the number of prayer-goers in The Great Synagogue, such that today the impressive building is used by only few congregants who pray on holidays and special occasions. In recent years, public figures have decided to conduct their Jewish wedding ceremonies at the synagogue.

History of the building

In 1913 a cornerstone was set in preparation for The Great Synagogue to be established on Yehuda Halevi Street. The construction was not undertaken because of various reasons, and in 1914 the Committee for The Great Synagogue conducted an open competition for architects for planning The Great Synagogue on Allenby Street. Architect Richard Michael won this competition, and also advanced the program for the synagogue. With the outbreak of World War I, Michael was drafted to the German army and forced to leave the country, and therefore did not complete the building plans for the synagogue building. He was replaced by Jewish German architect Alexander Baerwald, who was also the building planner for the Technion building (1912) and the Hebrew Reali School (1912) in Haifa, and other private and municipal buildings in Haifa and Tel Aviv.

In 1924 the cornerstone of the building was set in Allenby Street, as per the plans of the architect Yehuda Magidovitch. Construction of the synagogue building was delayed due to insufficient funds, until receiving a donation from Baron Rothschild, which brought the building to completion in 1925 by the constructor Samuel Nathan Wilson. The dome of the building was planned by the engineer Arpad Geuthe.

In 1969, with the intention to revive the synagogue and adapt it to milieu of the time, the building underwent drastic renovation by the plans of the architect Aryeh Elhanani, who added arches and cement supports to the building, thereby transforming the building into the style of modernism. Similarly, changes were made to the facade of the building, the furniture, Torah Ark, and lighting.

The building features a huge dome, elaborate lighting fixtures, and magnificent stained glass windows. The glass windows are replicas of windows of synagogues that were destroyed in Europe during the Holocaust.

Building periphery

The planning for the building's periphery was crafted by architect Ze'ev Rechter at the end of the 1930s. Rechter planned an Italian-style plaza to wrap around the northern and eastern side of the building. The plaza would wrap around a row of houses, elevated above the landline by oriental arches which would create space for commercial shops.

This plan was only partially carried out, and amongst the planned houses only Beit Manny was built as planned.

Weapon storage
After the King David Hotel Bombing in 1946, British authorities found weapons stored in the basement of the synagogue. In light of this finding, the synagogue caretaker Eliezer Neuman was detained and sentenced by military authorities to a one-year term.

References

External links

Orthodox synagogues in Israel
Synagogues completed in 1926
Synagogues in Tel Aviv
Synagogue buildings with domes
1926 establishments in Asia
Synagogues completed in 1969